Ferlin C. A. Sangma is an Indian politician and a former bureaucrat. She was elected to the Meghalaya Legislative Assembly from Selsella, Meghalaya in the by-election in 2019 as a member of the National People's Party.In 2022, ahead of 2023 Meghalaya Legislative Assembly election, she along with other 3 MLAs joined Bharatiya Janata Party.

References

Living people
Meghalaya MLAs 2018–2023
National People's Party (India) politicians
People from Tura, Meghalaya
Year of birth missing (living people)
Garo people